There are two Roman Catholic dioceses named Formosa:
 Roman Catholic Diocese of Formosa, Argentina, erected as a diocese in 1957 from the Diocese of Resistencia
 Roman Catholic Diocese of Formosa, Brazil, erected in 1956 from the Archdiocese of Goiás, and elevated to diocese in 1979

See also
 List of Roman Catholic dioceses in Taiwan on the island of Formosa